The 1908 World Series was the championship series in Major League Baseball for the 1908 season. The fifth edition of the World Series, it matched the defending National League champion Chicago Cubs against the American League champion Detroit Tigers in a rematch of the 1907 Series. In this first-ever rematch of this young event, the Cubs won in five games for their second straight World Series title.

The 1908 World Series was significant for being the last World Series championship the Cubs would win until  (108 years later). That became the longest World Series victory drought in MLB history. The Cubs had been one of baseball's most dominant teams in the early 1900s. This was the year of the infamous "Merkle's Boner" play that allowed the Chicago Cubs to reach the World Series after beating the New York Giants (now the San Francisco Giants) in a one-game "playoff", actually the makeup game for the tie that the Merkle play had caused.

The Series was anticlimactic after tight pennant races in both leagues. Ty Cobb had a much better World Series than in the previous year, as did the rest of his team. The final two games, held in Detroit, were shutouts. This was also the most poorly attended World Series in history, with the final game drawing a record-low 6,210 fans. Attendance in Chicago was harmed by a ticket-scalping scheme that fans accused the club's owner of participating in, and the World Series was boycotted to some degree.

For the first time, four umpires were used in the series, in alternating two-man teams. Games 1, 4, and 5 were played in Detroit, while Games 2 and 3 were played in Chicago. Had the series continued, Game 6 would have been played in Chicago, and the home team for Game 7 would have been decided randomly, "by lot".

Summary

Matchups

Game 1

The Tigers struck first in Game 1 when Matty McIntyre singled to lead off the bottom of the first off of Ed Reulbach, stole second and scored on Ty Cobb's two-out single, but the Cubs responded in the third off of Ed Killian when after a leadoff double and single, Frank Schulte's RBI single tied the game. After a bunt groundout, Harry Steinfeldt's RBI single put Chicago up 2–1. After a walk, Ed Summers relieved Killian and allowed an RBI groundout to Joe Tinker and Johnny Kling reached on an error that allowed another run to score. The Cubs added another run in the seventh on Steinfedlt's sacrifice fly. In the bottom of the inning, with runners on second and third, Boss Schmidt's groundout, Red Downs's ground-rule double, and Summers's single scored a run each. Next inning, Claude Rossman's two-run single off of Mordecai Brown put the Tigers up 6–5. In the top of the ninth, three straight one-out singles loaded the bases before Solly Hofman's single scored two and Joe Tinker's bunt single scored another. After a double steal, Johnny King's two-run single put the Cubs up 10–6. Brown pitched a scoreless bottom of the ninth despite allowing a single and walk as the Cubs went up 1–0 in the series.

Game 2

A scoreless tie in the bottom of the eighth came to an end when Joe Tinker's two-run homer launched a six-run Cub outburst. After a ground-rule double and groundout, RBI singles by Jimmy Sheckard and Johnny Evers and an RBI triple by Frank Schulte (the last two hits coming off after stolen bases) scored a run each. A wild pitch to Frank Chance scored the Cubs' last run. The Tigers avoided a shutout in the ninth when Davy Jones drew a leadoff walk, moved to second on a groundout and scored on Ty Cobb's single. Orval Overall's complete-game win took just 90 minutes.

Game 3

It was in this game that Ty Cobb enjoyed the finest World Series outing he ever had. The 21-year-old Georgian rapped three singles and a double in five at-bats, and stole two bases. In the top of the ninth, he singled and promptly stole second and third, but then the hyped-up boy wonder pressed his luck and was thrown out trying to steal home.  This was the only Tiger win in their back-to-back first two World Series losses to the Cubs. Detroit struck first in the top of the first when Charley O'Leary hit a one-out single, moved to second on a groundout and scored on Ty Cobb's single. The Cubs responded in the fourth on Frank Chance's RBI single. After stealing second, an error on Harry Steinfeldt's ground ball and Solly Hofman's triple scored a run each. In the top of the sixth, after a single and walk, singles by Sam Crawford, Ty Cobb, and Claude Rossman scored a run each. After a double play, Ira Thomas's RBI double made it 6–3 Tigers. They added two more runs in the eighth on Bill Coughlin's bases loaded sacrifice fly followed by George Mullin's RBI single.

Game 4

This one was over in 95 minutes. RBI singles by Harry Steinfeldt and Solly Hofman in the third inning after two walks gave Mordecai Brown all the support he'd need. Brown allowed only four hits and walked none. The Cubs added another run in the ninth when Frank Chance reached on an error with two on.

Game 5

The attendance during this last game of the 1908 World Series was the smallest crowd in Series history, at 6,210.

In the first inning, Overall registered four strikeouts, as Claude Rossman reached on an uncaught third strike. This was the first, and to date only, instance of a four-strikeout inning in a World Series game. Overall allowed only three hits, walking four and striking out 10 for his second win of the series. In  innings pitched during the series, he allowed only seven hits and two runs for an ERA of 0.98.

The Cubs scored the game's first run in the first on three straight one-out singles, the last of which to Frank Chance scoring a run, then added another run in the fifth on Johnny Evers's double after two walks.

Boss Schmidt, who made the last out of the 1907 Series with a popup to short, also made the last out of this Series with a feeble catcher-to-first groundout.

This was also the first World Series game in which neither team committed an error.

Composite line score
1908 World Series (4–1): Chicago Cubs (N.L.) over Detroit Tigers (A.L.)

Sources

References

External links

World Series
Detroit Tigers postseason
Chicago Cubs postseason
World Series
World Series
World Series
1900s in Chicago
World Series
World Series
Baseball competitions in Detroit
Baseball competitions in Chicago